The stern is the rear or aft part of a ship or boat.

Stern  may also refer to:

People
 Stern (given name)
 Stern (surname)
 Stern family, a Jewish French banking family
 Daniel Stern, pen name of Marie d'Agoult (1805–1876), author and paramour of Franz Liszt

Schools
 Stern College for Women, an undergraduate women's college of Yeshiva University, located in Manhattan, New York
 Stern Conservatory, a former private music school in Berlin, now part of the Berlin University of the Arts
New York University Stern School of Business

Other uses
 Stern (magazine), a weekly German news magazine 
 Stern Review, an influential report on global warming's economic effect
 Stern (game company), two related arcade gaming companies
 Stern baronets, two extinct titles in the Baronetage of the United Kingdom
 Stern Hall (disambiguation)
 Stern House, a reconstructed building in Jerusalem
 USS Stern, a World War II destroyer escort

See also 
 Lehi (group), underground Zionist organization informally known as the Stern Gang or Group
 Selim I, Sultan of the Ottoman Empire nicknamed Yavuz ("the Stern") 
 Sterns (disambiguation)